Macroseius is a genus of mites in the Phytoseiidae family.

Species
 Macroseius biscutatus Chant, Denmark & Baker, 1959

References

Phytoseiidae